The Argolida Football Clubs Association was founded on 12 August 1964. Its formation was agreed at a meeting held on 23 May 1963, during a Panargiakos F.C. council meeting. The chairman of the meeting, Nikos Zafeiris, asked for approval for the founding of a Football association in Argolida. The Argolida's football clubs used to play at Argolidokorinthias Football Association, which was based in Corinthos. The Argolida Football Clubs Association organizes many events that support the interests of its members. There are more than 60 football pitches which are used by football clubs that are members of this association. The association organises an annual international football tournament called "Atreus" which is under the auspices of the Hellenic Football Federation and with the cooperation of Arsenal Soccer Schools.

Founder members
Football clubs that were founder members included Panargiakos F.C. and:

Apollon Argous
Argonatautis N. Kiou
AEK Argous
Proitos T.Tyrinthas
A.E. Kranidi

Clubs

There are 100 football teams that are members of Argolida Football Clubs Association which includes:

Sport's Club
A.E. Kranidi
AEK Argos
A.O. Amygdalitsas
A.O. Dalamandaras
A.O. Mideas
A.O. N. Kiou
A.O. Schinohoriou
Aias Traheias
Academy 98
Akratitos
Anagennisi Lygourio
Apollon
Argeias
Argeiakos
Argolida 2000
Argonautis
Aris Roinou
Arizona
Aristeas
Aristeionas
Arkadios
Asklipios
Asteras Drepaniakos
Atromitos
Achladokabos
Diovouniotis
Danaoi
Dimaina
Diomidis
Doxa
Doxa Adamiou
Doxa Poul
Dryopi
Enosi Mideas
Erasinos
Ermis Ermionis
Ermis Kyverion
Iraklis Karyas
Thermissia
Thiseas
Thyella
Thyella limnon
Thyella Mal.
Thyella Skaf.
Inachos
Karantzas
Keraunos Irion
Kechries
Koronis Koiladas
Kreon
Leukakia
Lygeus
Midas
Methana
Metohi
Mikti Argolidas Juniors
Mikti Argolidas Youngsters
Borsia
Mikinaikos
Myloi
Achilleas
Niki
Olympiakos Argous
Olympiakos Koutsopodiou
Orneatis Gymnou
Pammideatikos
Pananyfiakos
Panargiakos F.C.
Panasinaikos
Panionios Dalamanaras
Pannafpliakos F.C.
PAOK Koutsopodi
Plataniti
Plataniti Evolution
Poros F.C.
Portoheliakos
Poseidon Dydimon
Poseidon Porou
Proitos
Prosymni
Pyrgiotika
Saronas
Spetses
Tolo
Toxotis
Troiziniakos
Chelo
Ydra
Feidon
Foinikas
Honikas

See also
Atreus

References

External links
Ένωση Ποδοσφαιρικών Σωματείων Αργολίδας
Hellenic Football Federation
Arsenal Soccer Schools in Greece

Argolis
Association football organizations
Association football governing bodies in Greece